The Goody's 250 was a NASCAR Busch Series stock car race held at Martinsville Speedway, in Martinsville, Virginia. The race was only held once, on July 22, 2006, as a standalone event during the summer. It had been speculated the race would be held at night, under a temporary lighting system to be installed at the track,  instead it was held in the afternoon instead. The Goody's 250 replaced the ITT Industries & Goulds Pumps Salute to the Troops 250 on the Busch Series schedule. After a Busch Series Martinsville record high 19 cautions for 87 laps, the Goody's 250 was replaced in 2007 by the NAPA Auto Parts 200 at the Circuit Gilles Villeneuve road course in Montreal, Quebec, Canada. The race was the final start in NASCAR for Darrell Waltrip and Ricky Craven.

Report

Background

The Goody's 250 was the 21st out of 35 scheduled stock car races of the 2006 NASCAR Busch Series. It was held on July 22, 2006 at Martinsville Speedway, in Martinsville, Virginia, a short track that holds NASCAR races. The standard track at Martinsville Speedway is a four-turn,  oval. Its turns are banked at eleven degrees, and neither the front stretch (the location of the finish line) nor the back stretch is banked.

Before the race, Kevin Harvick led the Drivers' Championship with 3,092 points, with Carl Edwards in second and Clint Bowyer third. Denny Hamlin and J. J. Yeley were fourth and fifth, and Greg Biffle, Paul Menard, Kyle Busch, Johnny Sauter and Kenny Wallace rounded out the top ten. This was the first Busch Series race to be held at Martinsville since October 1994, and it had been speculated the race would be held under night conditions with a temporary lighting system installed at the track, but it was held in the afternoon instead.

Two drivers chose to make a one-off return to NASCAR at the race. Three-time Winston Cup Series champion Darrell Waltrip drove the No. 99 Michael Waltrip Racing car by gaining his wife Stevie's permission after his younger brother Michael Waltrip asked if he wanted to race. Since his car was 16th in the Owner's Championship, Waltrip earned an automatic qualifying berth for the event. Despite winning eleven times at Martinsville in the Nextel Cup Series, the Goody's 250 marked Waltrip's first appearance at the track in the Busch Series. Waltrip said he was entering the race because of his belief he could be competitive: "I’m going to come in there, I’ve got the latest and greatest equipment and Michael’s bunch is excited, I’m pumped and I think we’ll have a lot of fun." 1992 NASCAR Busch Series Rookie of the Year and two-time Nextel Cup winner Ricky Craven returned to drive the No. 14 car owned by FitzBradshaw Racing. However, unlike Waltrip, Craven needed to qualify since both FitzBradshaw cars were not within the top-thirty placings in the Owners' Championship. Other drivers returning to compete in the Busch Series included Burney Lamar and Boris Said.

Practice and qualifying

Three practice sessions were held before the Saturday race: all three took place on Friday. The first session ran for 60 minutes, with a half hour practice session reserved for rookie drivers following shortly after. The final practice session lasted 60 minutes. A one-hour test session was scheduled beforehand and it saw Jason Leffler set the only lap time to go under the twenty seconds mark at 19.888 seconds, ahead of the No. 64 car shared by Steve Wallace and his father Rusty Wallace. Sauter was third, Mark McFarland placed fourth, and Menard rounded out the top five. Mike Bliss, Caleb Holman and Eric McClure crashed during the session and the damage to their cars necessitated their withdrawal from the race.

In the first practice session, Stacy Compton was the quickest driver in the field with a lap of 20.010 seconds, seven thousands of a second faster than anyone else on the track. His closest challenger was Steve Wallace in second, with Leffler third, and Brandon Miller fourth. McFarland was fifth-fastest, and Matt McCall came sixth. Kevin Hamlin, Randy LaJoie, David Green, and Dennis Setzer rounded out the session's top ten drivers. Sauter paced the final practice session with a time of 19.877 seconds; Leffler was 0.026 seconds in arrears in second and Casey Atwood came third. Menard was fourth-quickest, ahead of Green and Aric Almirola. McFarland was seventh-fastest, Lamar placed eighth, Ron Hornaday Jr. ninth and Jason Keller completed the top ten heading into qualifying.

Race results

References

2006 in NASCAR
2006 in sports in Virginia
Former NASCAR races
July 2006 sports events in the United States